Feniton railway station serves the village of Feniton in Devon, England. It was opened by the London and South Western Railway (LSWR) in 1860 but is now operated by South Western Railway which provides services on the West of England Main Line.

History

It was named Feniton after the nearest village, but less than a year later it was renamed (on 1 July 1861) as Ottery and Sidmouth Road. In February 1868 this was changed again to Feniton for Ottery St Mary.

A third platform was provided to accommodate branch line trains; this was a terminal bay at the Yeovil end of the westbound platform. It was on this platform that the main two-storey building was situated.

A goods yard and goods shed was provided adjacent to the bay platform. This was closed on 6 September 1965. The following year saw the withdrawal of local stopping trains on the main line, but Sidmouth Junction remained open until 6 March 1967 when passenger services were withdrawn from the branch lines, after which it closed.

The station was however reopened by British Rail on 5 May 1971 as a result of local campaigning by the residents of the expanding village, assuming the original Feniton name. A ticket office was erected in 1974 as the original building had been demolished while the station was closed. The platform was rebuilt and lengthened in 1992 but is still shorter than many of the trains that call.

Platform layout
The platform is on the south side of the line, east of the level crossing of Ottery Road. The disused eastbound platform still stands but the goods yard site is now occupied by houses.

Services

Off-peak, all services at Feniton are operated by South Western Railway using  and  DMUs.

Due to the short platform at this station, passengers wishing to alight need to be in the front 3 coaches of the train as the platform can only take 3-car trains.

Signalling 
The station was built next to the level crossing of the Ottery Road which was operated by the station staff. A signal box was provided in 1875 at the east end of the station on the north side of the line, opposite goods yard. Because it was too far from the level crossing a small signal box was provided at that end of the station to control the level crossing. The main signal box was closed on 21 May 1967 but the level crossing box was retained. The line through the station reduced to just a single track on 11 June 1967. In 1974 the level crossing gates were replaced by lifting barriers; the level crossing box was abolished at the same time and the barriers were operated from a panel within the station building until March 2012 when signalling and level crossing control was transferred to Basingstoke Area Signalling Centre.

See also
 Southern Railway routes west of Salisbury

References

External links

 Subterranea Britannica site record for Sidmouth Junction station

Railway stations in Devon
Former London and South Western Railway stations
Railway stations in Great Britain opened in 1860
Railway stations in Great Britain closed in 1967
Railway stations in Great Britain opened in 1971
Reopened railway stations in Great Britain
Railway stations served by South Western Railway
William Tite railway stations
Beeching closures in England
Railway stations served by Great Western Railway
DfT Category E stations